Eric B. Smith (born September 11, 1942) is an American former politician in the state of Florida.

Smith was born in Miami. He attended the University of Florida and earned a Juris Doctor in 1967. He served in the Florida House of Representatives from 1973 to 1978, as a Democrat, representing the 19th district.

References

Living people
1942 births
Democratic Party members of the Florida House of Representatives